Challenge to Be Free  (a.k.a.  Mad Trapper of the Yukon and Mad Trapper) is an anti-hero film  directed by Tay Garnett and starring Mike Mazurki. The film's plot was a loosely based on the 1931 Royal Canadian Mounted Police (RCMP) pursuit of a trapper named Albert Johnson, the reputed "Mad Trapper of Rat River".  The film was shot and originally released in 1972 with the title Mad Trapper of the Yukon; it was re-released in 1975 as  Challenge to Be Free.

Another film exploring the same topic was The Mad Trapper (1972),  a British made-for-television production. A later fictionalized account, Death Hunt (1981), also based on the story of the  RCMP pursuit of  Albert Johnson, was directed by Peter R. Hunt and starred Charles Bronson, Lee Marvin, Angie Dickinson, and Carl Weathers.

Plot
In Alaska, Trapper attempts to live in harmony with nature but is aware that other trappers are using inhumane traps. When he is confronted by rival trappers over his interference with their trap lines, they bring along Sargent, the local police officer. Feeling intimidated, Trapper fights back, shooting his way out of his cabin and embarking on a desperate attempt to escape the authorities.

Cast

Production
Challenge to Be Free was filmed mainly on location in Alaska, as the locale of the "Mad Trapper" manhunt was changed from the Yukon to the United States. As an American production, Johnson's character was changed to simply "Trapper". The theme song "Trapper Man" was featured. It was filmed and originally  released with little promotion as The Mad Trapper of the Yukon in 1972. In 1975, the title was changed and the film was given a wider release, primarily marketed towards younger audiences.

Reception
Reviewer Leonard Maltin characterized Challenge to Be Free as being "... A very charming film, wonderful for younger viewers."

See also
 List of American films of 1975
 List of American films of 1972

References

Notes

Citations

Bibliography

 Anderson, Frank W. and Art Downs. The Death of Albert Johnson, Mad Trapper of Rat River. Surrey, British Columbia, Canada: Heritage House, 1986. .
 Maltin, Leonard. Leonard Maltin's Movie Guide 2009. New York: New American Library, 2009 (originally published as TV Movies, then Leonard Maltin's Movie & Video Guide), First edition 1969, published annually since 1988. .
 North, Dick. The Mad Trapper of Rat River: A True Story of Canada's Biggest Manhunt. Toronto, Ontario, Canada: Macmillan Company, 1972. .

External links
 
 
 

1975 films
Films directed by Tay Garnett
1970s adventure films
Northern (genre) films
American films based on actual events
Films set in 1931
Royal Canadian Mounted Police in fiction
1970s English-language films